Irao Island (Iroo Island) is an island of the Philippines. Its highest elevation is about 23 m (75 ft.). It is one of the islands on the Babuyan Islands. It is found in Cagayan Valley, Cagayan.

References 

Islands of Cagayan
Babuyan Islands